Kokko is a Finnish surname. Notable people with the surname include:

 Aleksandr Kokko (born 1987), Soviet Union-born Finnish footballer
 Hanna Kokko (born 1971), Finnish biologist

 Väinö Kokko (1880–1943), Finnish politician
 Vesa Kokko, Finnish wheelchair curler and coach
 Yrjö Kokko (1903–1977), Finnish veterinarian and writer

Finnish-language surnames